56th General Assembly of Nova Scotia represented Nova Scotia between May 25, 1993, and February 12, 1998, its membership being set in the 1993 Nova Scotia general election. The Liberals led by John Savage formed the government. Russell MacLellan replaced Savage as party leader and Premier in 1997.

Division of seats

The division of seats within the Nova Scotia Legislature after the General Election of 1993

List of members

† denotes the speaker. Wayne Gaudet became speaker in 1996. Gerry Fogarty became speaker in 1997.

Former members of the 56th General Assembly

References
 

Terms of the General Assembly of Nova Scotia
1993 establishments in Nova Scotia
1998 disestablishments in Nova Scotia
20th century in Nova Scotia